This is a List of compositions by Charles Villiers Stanford.

Operas
 The Veiled Prophet (1877, perf. 1881)
 Savonarola (1883, perf. 1884)
 The Canterbury Pilgrims (1883, perf. 1884)
 The Miner of Falun (1888 Act I only; abandoned, unpub.)
 Lorenza, Op. 55 (1894, unperformed, unpub.)
 Shamus O'Brien, Op. 61 (1895, perf. 1896)
 Christopher Patch, the Barber of Bath, Op. 69 (1897, unperformed)
 Much Ado About Nothing or The Marriage of Hero, Op. 76a (1900, perf. 1901)
 The Critic, or An Opera Rehearsed, Op. 144 (1915, perf. 1916)
 The Travelling Companion, Op. 146 (1916, perf. posth. 1925)

Orchestral works

Symphonies 
No. 1 in B-flat major (1876)
No. 2 in D minor, "Elegiac" (1882)
No. 3 in F minor, "Irish", Op. 28 (1887)
No. 4 in F major, Op. 31 (1888) 
No. 5 in D major, "L'Allegro ed il Pensieroso", Op. 56 (1894)
No. 6 in E-flat major, "In Memoriam G. F. Watts", Op. 94 (1905) 
No. 7 in D minor, Op. 124 (1911)

Concertos 
Piano Concerto No. 0 in B flat major, WoO (early- no. "0") (1874)
Violin Concerto No. 0 in D major, WoO (early, 1875) 
Cello Concerto in D minor, WoO (1879/1880) 
Suite in D for violin and orchestra, Op. 32
Piano Concerto No. 1 in G major, Op. 59
Concert Variations upon an English Theme "Down Among the Dead Men" for piano and orchestra in C minor, Op. 71
Violin Concerto No. 1 in D major, Op. 74
Clarinet Concerto in A minor, Op. 80 (1902)
Piano Concerto No. 2 in C minor, Op. 126 (1911)
Violin Concerto No. 2 in G minor, Op.162 (1918; unfinished, orchestrated by Jeremy Dibble) 
Piano Concerto No. 3 in E flat major, Op. 171 (1919; unfinished, orchestrated by Geoffrey Bush) 
Variations for violin and orchestra, Op, 180 (1921) 
Concert Piece for organ and orchestra, Op. 181 (1921)

Irish Rhapsodies 
Irish Rhapsody for orchestra No. 1 in D minor, Op. 78
Irish Rhapsody for orchestra No. 2 in F minor, Op. 84 ("The Lament for the Son of Ossian")
Irish Rhapsody for cello and orchestra No. 3, Op. 137
Irish Rhapsody for orchestra No. 4 in A minor, Op. 141 ("The Fisherman of Loch Neagh and what he saw")
Irish Rhapsody for orchestra No. 5 in G minor, Op. 147
Irish Rhapsody for violin and orchestra No. 6, Op. 191

Other orchestral works 
Funeral March 'The Martyrdom'
Oedipus Rex, incidental music, Op. 29
 A Welcome March, Op. 87

Choral works

Anthems and motets 

Pater Noster (1874)
And I saw another Angel (Op. 37, No. 1) (1885)
If thou shalt confess (Op. 37, No. 2) (1885)
Three Latin Motets (Op. 38, published 1905)
Beati quorum via
Coelos ascendit hodie
Justorum animae
Ye Choirs of New Jerusalem (Op. 123, published 1911)
Eternal Father (Op.135)
For lo, I raise up (Op. 145)
The Lord is my Shepherd (composed 1886)
Why seek ye the living? (c. 1890)
Engelberg (1904)
 'How beauteous are their feet' (published 1923)

Services 
Morning, Evening, and Communion services:
B-flat major (Op. 10)
A-major (Op. 12)
F-major (Op. 36)
G-major (Op. 81)
C-major (Op. 115)
Festal Communion Service B flat major (Op. 128) (1910/11)
D major for Unison Choir (1923)
Magnificat and Nunc dimittis settings:
E flat major (1873; publ. 1996)
F major (Queens' Service) (1872; edited Ralph Woodward and publ. 1995)
on the 2nd and 3rd Gregorian Modes (1907)
A major (Op. 12)
B flat major (Op. 10)
C major (Op. 115)
G major (Op. 81)
Magnificat in B flat major for unaccompanied double choir, Op. 164 (September 1918): dedicated to the memory of Parry

Part-Songs 
4 Part-Songs for SATB, Op. 47 (1892)
Soft, soft wind
Sing heigh ho
Airly Beacon
The Knight's tomb
4 Part-Songs, for Male Voices TTBB, Op. 106
Autumn Leaves
Love's Folly
To his flocks
Fair Phyllis
4 Part-Songs, for SATB (also for SSAA) Op. 110
Valentine's Day
Dirge
The Fairies
Heraclitus
3 Part-Songs, for SATB Op. 111
A Lover's Ditty
The Praise of Spring
The Patient Lover
8 Part-Songs for SATB, Op. 119 (to poems by Mary Coleridge)
The Witch
Farewell, my joy
The Blue Bird
The Train
The Inkbottle
The Swallow
Chillingham
My heart in thine
8 Part-Songs for SATB, Op. 127 (to poems by Mary Coleridge)
Plighted
Veneta
When Mary thro' the garden went
The Haven
The Guest
Larghetto
Wilderspin
To a Tree

Miscellaneous 
On Time, Choral Song for unaccompanied double choir, Op. 142 Poem by John Milton
Six Elizabethan Pastorals for SATB, Op. 49
To his flocks	
Corydon, Arise!
Diaphenia
Sweet love for me
Damon's Passion	
Phoebe
Six Elizabethan Pastorals for SATB (Second set), Op. 53
On a hill there grows a flower
Like Desert Woods
Praised be Diana
Cupid and Rosalind
O shady vales
The Shepherd Doron's jig
Six Elizabethan Pastorals for SATB (Third set), Op. 67
A carol for Christmas	
The Shepherd's anthem	
Shall we go dance?
Love in prayers	
Of disdainful Daphne	
Love's fire
Six Irish Folksongs for SATB, Op. 78
Oh! breathe not his name
What the bee is to the flow'ret
At the mid hour of night
The Sword of Erin
It is not the tear
Oh the sight entrancing

Works for choir and orchestra 
The Resurrection, for tenor, choir and orchestra (1875) (Words by Friedrich Gottlieb Klopstock)
 Elegiac Ode, Op. 21 (1884), words from When Lilacs Last in the Dooryard Bloom'd by Walt Whitman
The Revenge, a ballad of the fleet, Op. 24 (1886) Words by Alfred, Lord Tennyson
 Mass in G major, Op. 46
 Missa 'Via Victrix 1914-1918' for solo soprano, contralto, tenor, bass, chorus, organ and orchestra, Op. 173 (1919)
Requiem, Op. 63 (1896) 
Te Deum, Op. 66 (1898; written for the Leeds Festival)
Songs of the Sea for solo baritone, choir (mixed or men's voices) ad lib. and orchestra, Op. 91 (words by Henry Newbolt)
Stabat Mater, "Symphonic Cantata" for solo soprano, mezzo-soprano, tenor, bass, choir and orchestra, Op. 96 (1906)
Song to the Soul, for choir and orchestra, Op. 97b (1913) (words by Walt Whitman)
Songs of the Fleet for solo baritone, SATB and orchestra, Op. 117 (words by Henry Newbolt)
At the Abbey Gate, cantata for solo baritone, SATB and orchestra, Op. 177 (1921)

Songs for solo voice(s) and piano 
 Six Songs, Op. 4 (Heinrich Heine), 1874
 Six Songs, Op. 7 (Heinrich Heine), c.1877
 La Belle dame sans merci (poem by John Keats), 1877
 Six Songs, Op. 19 (various), 1882
 A Child's Garland of Songs, Op. 30 (Robert Louis Stephenson), 1892
 Three Songs, Op. 43 (Robert Bridges), 1893
 The Clown's Songs from 'Twelfth Night' (Shakespeare), Op. 65, 1896
 An Irish Idyll in Six Miniatures, Op. 77 (Moira O'Neill), 1901
 Songs of Faith, Op. 97, set 1 (Tennyson) (No. 1-3); set 2 (Walt Whitman) (No. 4-6), 1906
 A Sheaf of Songs from Leinster, Op. 140 (Winifred Mary Letts), 1913

Chamber music 
String quartets
No. 1 in G major, Op. 44 (1891)
No. 2 in A minor, Op. 45 (1891)
No. 3 in D minor, Op. 64 (1897)
No. 4 in G minor, Op. 99 (1907)
No. 5 in B flat major, Op. 104 (1908)
No. 6 in A minor, Op. 122 (1910)
No. 7 in C minor, Op. 166 (1919)
No. 8 in E minor, Op. 167 (1919)
Other works for string ensemble
String quintet No. 1 in F major, Op. 85 for two violins, two violas & cello (1903)
String quintet No. 2 in C minor, Op. 86 (1903)
Piano trios
No. 1 in E flat major, Op. 35 (1889)
No. 2 in G minor, Op. 73 (1899)
No. 3 in A "Per aspera ad astra", Op. 158 (1918)
Works for violin and piano
Sonata No. 1 in D major, Op. 11 (1880)
Sonata No. 2 in A major, Op. 70 (1898)
Sonata No. 3, Op. 165 (1919)
Legend, WoO (1893)
Irish Fantasies, Op. 54 (1894)
Five Characteristic Pieces, Op. 93 (1905)
Six Irish Sketches, Op. 154 (1917)
Six Easy Pieces, Op. 155 (1917)
Five Bagatelles, Op. 183 (1921)
Six Irish Dances
Other works for solo instrument and piano
Sonata No. 1 in A major for violoncello & piano, Op. 9 (1878)
Sonata No. 2 in D minor for violoncello & piano, Op. 39 (1893)
Three Intermezzi for clarinet & piano, Op. 13 (1880)
Sonata for clarinet (or viola) & piano, Op. 129 (1912)
Other works for strings and piano
Piano quartet No. 1 in F major, Op. 15 (1879)
Piano quartet No. 2, Op. 133 (1912)
Piano quintet in D minor, Op. 25 (1887)
 Serenade in F major for Nonet, Op. 95 (1906)
 Fantasy No. 1 in G minor for clarinet & string quartet, WoO (1921)
 Fantasy No. 2 in F major for clarinet & string quartet, WoO (1922)
 Phantasy for horn & string quartet in A minor, WoO (1922)

Piano music 
 Piano Suite (4), Op. 2
 Toccata in C Major, Op. 3
 Old and New Dances (10), Op. 58 
 Dante Rhapsodies (3), Op. 92
 Characteristic Pieces (6), Op. 132
 Capriccios (5), Op. 136
 Night Thoughts (6), Op. 148 
 Scènes de ballet (6), Op. 150
 Preludes in all the keys (24), Set I, Op. 163
 Ballade, Op. 170
 Waltzes (3), Op. 178 
 Preludes in all the keys (24), Set II, Op. 179
 A Toy Story (6)
 Elementary Sketches (6)
 Fancies (3)
 Novellettes (2) 
 Primary Sketches (6) 
 Song-Tunes (6)
 Waltzes (6) and Coda (1)

Organ music 
 Chorale Preludes (8)
 Chorale Preludes, Op. 182
 Fantasia and Toccata, Op. 57 (1894, revised 1917)
 Fantasie on Intercessor, Op. 187
 Four Intermezzi
 Idyl and Fantasia, Op. 121
 Intermezzo on Londonderry Air, Op. 189
 Prelude and Fugue in E minor
 Quasi una Fantasia (1921)
 Six Occasional Preludes, 2 books
 Six Preludes, Op. 88
 Six Short Preludes and Postludes, Op. 101
 Six Short Preludes and Postludes, Op. 105
On a theme of Orlando Gibbons Song 34: The Angels' Song
On a theme of Orlando Gibbons Song 22:
Lento
On a theme of Orlando Gibbons Song 24:
Trio
Allegro
 Sonata No. 1, Op. 149 (1917)
 Sonata "Eroica" No. 2, Op. 151 (1917)
 Sonata "Britannica" No. 3, Op. 152 (1918)
 Sonata "Celtica" No. 4, Op. 153 (1920)
 Sonata "Quasi Una Fantasia" No. 5, Op. 159 (1921)
 Te Deum Laudamus Fantasy
 Three Preludes and Fugues, Op. 193 (1923)
 Toccata and Fugue in D minor (1907)
 Fantasie and Fugue in D minor, Op. 103 (1907)

Miscellaneous
 11-bell version of the Whittington chimes (1905)

References

 
Stanford